The Edelstam Prize, named after Harald Edelstam, is awarded annually by the Harald Edelstam Foundation. 
The Edelstam Prize is awarded to a person who has shown outstanding contributions and courage in defense of Human Rights. The Edelstam Prize is named for the Swedish diplomat and ambassador Harald Edelstam (1913-1989). Harald Edelstam distinguished himself as diplomat by his professional competence, his bravery and his civic courage in the fight for Human Rights. He was an early proponent and symbol of what is today known as "Responsibility to Protect", and his memorable acts contributed to saving more than a thousand lives.

The winner of the Edelstam Prize can be someone from the private sector or a public servant. The winner embodies Ambassador Harald Edelstam's spirit in a country/countries where Human Rights, according to international law, have been violated.

The laureate demonstrates an ability to analyze and handle complex situations and to defend Human Rights. The candidate has, presumably in a complex situation, been able to take a decisive role in helping threatened people or directly saving human lives. Civic courage is a central parameter in the selection of the successful candidate.

The Jury 
An international jury selects the winners from a list of nominated candidates. The jury is chaired by Harald Edelstam's granddaughter Caroline Edelstam, co-founder of the Edelstam Foundation. The other members are
 Dr. Pascoal Mocumbi, former Prime Minister of Mozambique (1994-2004), representing Africa
 Judge Shirin Ebadi, Nobel Peace Prize Winner in 2003, representing Asia 
 Former Judge Baltasar Garzón, who served on Spain's central criminal court, a consistent fighter for Human Rights, representing Europe. Baltasar Garzón is most famous for indicting the Chilean president, General Augusto Pinochet, for the alleged deaths and torture of Spanish citizens.
 Justice Louise Arbour, former UN High Commissioner of Human Rights, representing North America
  Dr. Luis Moreno-Ocampo, former Chief Prosecutor of the International Criminal Court, representing Latin America
 Professor Philip Alston, UN's special rapporteur on extreme poverty and human rights, representing Oceania

The Nomination Committee 

The Nomination Committee consists of 
Mrs.  (Chair), former Secretary General for Amnesty Sweden 
Professor Sadiq Jalal al-Azm, philosopher of Syrian origin striving for intellectual freedom and freedom of speech
Professor Vitit Muntarbhorn, United Nations former Special Rapporteur on the Situation of Human Rights in Democratic People's Republic of Korea
Deputy , Member of the Chilean Chamber of Deputies’ Commission for Human Rights
Silvia Escobar, former Human Rights Ambassador in Spain
Professor Yash Ghai, UN's former Special Representative on Human Rights in Cambodia
Lee Cheuk-yan, General Secretary of the Hong Kong Confederation of Trade Unions

Edelstam Prize Laureate 2012 
The Edelstam Prize Jury's motivation to give Mrs. Bahareh Hedayat the Edelstam Prize is: "Mrs. Bahareh Hedayat has through her outstanding courage and commitment to justice actively worked against Human Rights violations in Iran. In spite of serious warnings and threats from the regime’s security and intelligence forces, she has repeatedly risked her own life and freedom when defending Human Rights. She has been arrested upon several occasions, and is imprisoned right now for these reasons. The Harald Edelstam Foundation considers her a prisoner of conscience, and in consequence respectfully asks the authorities of the Republic of Iran to set her free."

Edelstam Prize Laureate 2014 
The Edelstam Prize Jury's motivation to give Mr. Benjamin Manuel Jerónimo the Edelstam Prize is: "Benjamín Manuel Jerónimo is a Mayan from Guatemala. Mayan communities, in spite of being the majority of the population, have been exploited, discriminated against, and victimized in their own homeland for centuries. The worst period came between 1960 and 1996: egregious abuses of human rights were perpetrated in Guatemala during the internal armed conflict. According to the CEH (UN backed Truth Commission) 200,000 civilians were murdered and 50,000 were forcibly disappeared. Most of them, 83% (93% of the abuses caused by the State), were defenseless indigenous Mayans. After the signature of the Peace Agreements, nobody was made accountable for these heinous crimes.
Benjamín considered that those responsible for the crimes should be brought to justice. It was not an easy task, since discrimination, threats, retaliations and violence persist in Guatemala, and the rate of violent deaths today is double that during the war. Benjamín represents the voice of the victims; has courageous and tirelessly worked for decades in defense of human rights, truth and justice for the indigenous communities in his country, despite repeated threats against his life. His endeavor and commitment are an example and reminder every day to the international community than most of the perpetrators in Guatemala remain unpunished."

See also 
 Harald Edelstam

References 

 Uruguay: Mujica firma apoyo para Premio Harald Edelstam (Spanish)

External links 
http://www.edelstamprize.org/

Peace awards
Humanitarian and service awards
Courage awards